Live: In the Shadow of the Blues is the third live album by the band Whitesnake. Included are four new studio tracks. The album was recorded on a world tour which began on 9 May 2006 in Zepp Fukuoka, Fukuoka, Japan. The Japanese concerts were followed by concerts in Europe and UK.  The tour went to twenty two countries and ended on 9 August 2006 in NIA, Birmingham, UK.  The album was released in Europe on 24 November 2006 and was released in Japan on WEA. The album features most of Whitesnake's biggest hits.

Track listing
Disc 1
"Bad Boys" (David Coverdale, John Sykes) - 6:22
"Slide It In" (Coverdale) - 5:11
"Slow an' Easy" (Coverdale, Micky Moody) - 6:54
"Love Ain't No Stranger" (Coverdale, Mel Galley) - 4:31
"Judgement Day" (Coverdale, Adrian Vandenberg) - 5:34
"Is This Love" (Coverdale, Sykes) - 4:58
"Blues for Mylene" (Doug Aldrich) - 3:31
"Snake Dance" (Coverdale, Aldrich) - 2:03
"Crying in the Rain" (Coverdale) - 5:46
"Ain't No Love in the Heart of the City" (Michael Price, Dan Walsh) - 8:44
"Fool for Your Loving" (Coverdale, Moody, Bernie Marsden) - 4:51
"Here I Go Again" (Coverdale, Marsden) - 5:53
"Still of the Night" (Coverdale, Sykes) - 8:38

Disc 2
"Burn - Stormbringer" (Coverdale, Ritchie Blackmore, Jon Lord, Ian Paice) - 8:38
"Give Me All Your Love" (Coverdale, Sykes) - 4:27
"Walking in the Shadow of the Blues" (Coverdale, Marsden) - 5:10
"The Deeper the Love" (Coverdale, Vandenberg) - 4:31
"Ready an' Willing" (Coverdale, Moody, Neil Murray, Lord, Paice) - 5:41
"Don't Break My Heart Again"  (Coverdale) - 6:08
"Take Me with You" (Coverdale, Moody) - 7:50
"Ready to Rock" (Coverdale, Aldrich) - 4:19
New studio recording
"If You Want Me" (Coverdale, Aldrich) - 4:08
New studio recording
"All I Want Is You" (Coverdale, Aldrich) - 4:12
New studio recording
"Dog" (Coverdale, Aldrich) - 3:27
New studio recording
"Crying in the Rain" (extended version with Tommy Aldridge drum solo) (Coverdale) - 12:25
Bonus track on Special Limited Edition only

Personnel
 David Coverdale - lead Vocals
 Doug Aldrich - guitar, backing vocals
 Reb Beach - guitar, backing vocals
 Timothy Drury - keyboards, backing vocals
 Uriah Duffy - bass, backing vocals
 Tommy Aldridge - drums

Charts

References

External links
 Doug Aldrich's official website

Whitesnake live albums
2006 live albums
SPV/Steamhammer live albums
Warner Records live albums
Live hard rock albums
Live heavy metal albums